St Chad's Church may refer to:
St Chad's Church, Chadwell Heath, London
St. Chad's Church, Burton-on-Trent, Staffordshire
St Chad's Church, Claughton, Lancashire
St Chad's Church, Far Headingley, West Yorkshire
St Chad's Church, Farndon, Cheshire
St Chad's Church, Holt, Wales
St Chad's Church, Hopwas, Staffordshire
St Chad's Church, Kirkby, Merseyside
St Chad's Church, Over, Cheshire
St Chad's Church, Poulton-le-Fylde, Lancashire
St Chad's Church, Rochdale, Greater Manchester
St Chad's Church, Tushingham, Cheshire
St Chad's Church, Wybunbury, Cheshire
St Chad's Church, Shrewsbury, Shropshire
St Chad's Church, Stafford, Staffordshire

See also
St. Chad's Cathedral, Birmingham
St Chad's Chapel, Tushingham, Cheshire
St Chad's College, Durham University